Maeba is a surname. Notable people with the surname include:

, Japanese Paralympic athlete
Lee Maeba (born 1966), Nigerian politician
, Japanese samurai
Maeba, studio album of italian singer Mina of 2018.

Japanese-language surnames